Ontocetus is an extinct genus of walrus, an aquatic carnivoran of the family Odobenidae, endemic to coastal regions of the southern North Sea and the southeastern coastal regions of the U.S. during the Miocene-Pleistocene.

Taxonomy
The type species, Ontocetus emmonsi, was named by Joseph Leidy in 1859 on the basis of a single tusk-like tooth (USNM 329064) collected by Ebenezer Emmons from the early Pliocene (Zanclean) Yorktown Formation of North Carolina.

In the meantime, marine mammals fossils were being unearthed in Neogene deposits in the vicinity of Antwerp, Belgium as well as Suffolk, England. One of these fossils was identified as an odobenid and named Alachtherium cretsii. in 1867. An isolated tooth (RBINS 2892) was named Trichechodon koninckii in 1871. The fossils from Suffolk were named Trichechodon huxleyi in 1865. For decades, however, Ontocetus was tossed aside as a physeterid, as the type specimen was believed to have been missing. For example, Ontocetus was at one time considered a synonym of the physeterid Hoplocetus. In the meantime, further Pliocene walrus fossils were collected from the North Atlantic, including the holotypes of Alachitherium antverpiensis, Alachitherium antwerpiensis, Prorosmarus alleni, and Alachitherium africanum.

In 2008, all specimens of Pliocene odobenids from the North Atlantic region were reviewed following the rediscovery of the Ontocetus emmonsi holotype in the 1990s. T. huxleyi, A. cretsii, A. antwerpiensis, A. antverpiensis, A. africanum, and P. alleni were declared junior synonyms of O. emmonsi based on comparisons with USNM 329064. T. koninckii, however, was found to be undiagnostic and designated a nomen dubium.

Misassigned species
As a side note, Ontocetus oxymycterus was named by Remington Kellogg in 1925 on the basis of USNM 10923, collected from the middle Miocene (Serravallian) Monterey Formation in Santa Barbara, California. It was recombined as Scaldicetus oxymycterus by Kohno and Ray (2008), since O. emmonsi was odobenid and O. oxymycterus was physeteroid. Boersma and Pyenson (2015) made it the type species of the genus Albicetus.

References 

Evolution: What the Fossils Say and Why It Matters by Donald R. Prothero and Carl Buell 
Marine Mammals: Evolutionary Biology by Annalisa Berta, James L. Sumich, and Kit M. Kovacs

Pliocene pinnipeds
Miocene pinnipeds
Pleistocene pinnipeds
Prehistoric carnivoran genera
Prehistoric mammals of Europe
Prehistoric pinnipeds of North America
Odobenids
Fossil taxa described in 1859
Taxa named by Joseph Leidy